Neustädter Binnenwasser is a lake near Neustadt in Schleswig-Holstein, Germany.

Lakes of Schleswig-Holstein
Nature reserves in Schleswig-Holstein
Bay of Lübeck